St. Stephen's Church is a protected cultural monument situated in Nitra. The beginning of the present-day church dates back to the 10th century. In the following two centuries, St. Stephen's Church was rebuilt. In early 18th century the church was renewed to its final Baroque style. This site is a rare medieval structure with the sanctuary beneath a Baroque semicircular vault with lunettes. In the interior of the church parts of the Romanesque frescoes are still visible. The church was rebuilt by František Maťašovský in 1720.

Churches in Slovakia
Buildings and structures in Nitra
Churches in Nitra